Engystomops freibergi is a frog native to the Amazonian Brazil, southeastern Peru, and Amazonian Bolivia. For a while, it was considered to be a synonym of Engystomops petersi, its sibling species, but its species status was resurrected in a study published in 1998. Nevertheless, these two species have also been mixed in later studies, and there are records from the Guianas that have not yet been allocated to either species. Divergence of these two species seems to have been driven by behavioural isolation related to male call characteristics more than geographic isolation.

Description
Engystomops freibergi are relatively small frogs. Males measure  in snout–vent length and females . Dorsal colouration is variable. Skin on dorsum is warty, bearing small tubercles with scattered larger tubercles.

Habitat
Engystomops freibergi is a locally common species found in lowland Amazon rainforest. These frogs are nocturnal and usually found in the leaf litter in primary forest. They feed primarily on termites.

Reproduction
The breeding period coincides with the rainy season (December–March). Males call at night near temporary ponds and slow-moving streams. The call consists of a prefix and a "whine" component, and in some populations, a third "squawk" component. Foam nests are deposited on the surface of ponds.

References

freibergi
Amphibians of Bolivia
Amphibians of Brazil
Amphibians of Peru
Amphibians described in 1969